The Comac C919 is a narrow-body airliner developed by Chinese aircraft manufacturer Comac.
The development program was launched in 2008. Production began in December 2011, with the first prototype rolled out on 2 November 2015 and having its maiden flight on 5 May 2017. On 29 September 2022, it received its CAAC type certificate, and the first airliner was delivered to China Eastern Airlines on 9 December 2022.

The aircraft, primarily constructed with aluminium alloys, is powered by CFM International LEAP turbofan engines and will be able to carry 156 to 168 passengers in a normal operating configuration up to 5,555 km (3000 nmi).

Naming
In the model number, the C stands for "Comac". The C also has the implication that forms an "ABC" parallel situation with Airbus and Boeing.

Development

The 2008 program launch initially targeted a maiden flight in 2014. Comac applied for a type certificate for the aircraft from the Civil Aviation Authority of China on 28 October 2010. At that time the company intended to manufacture up to 2,300 aircraft of the type. In June 2011, COMAC and Irish low-cost airline Ryanair signed an agreement to co-operate on the development of the C919. In 2012 Airbus' chief strategist Marwan Lahoud assumed that the aircraft would offer competition to Airbus by 2020.

On 24 November 2011, Comac announced the completion of the joint definition phase, marking the end of the preliminary design phase for the C919, with estimated completion of the detailed design phase in 2012. Production of the first C919 prototype began on 9 December 2011. The C919's aerodynamics were designed with the help of the Tianhe-2 supercomputer. The annual production was targeted at 150 planes by 2020. Canada's Bombardier Aerospace started collaborating in March 2012 on supply chain services, electrical systems, human interface, cockpit, flight training, flight-test support, sales, and marketing.

Its announced development budget was 58 billion yuan ($9.5 billion) but its actual cost was estimated at well over $20 billion. The first prototype was expected to complete final assembly in 2014 and perform its first flight in 2015; however, delivery was delayed again until 2018 due to technical difficulties and supply issues. At the November 2014 Zhuhai Airshow, it was announced that the first flight would be delayed to 2017. On 2 November 2015, Comac rolled out its first C919 aircraft.

In May 2018, the development of a composite wing completed in 2012 was revealed years after abandoning it for a metallic one, as static and damage tolerance tests were completed, verifying the structural design and strength before full-size composite wingbox tests.
On 12 July, the static test aircraft simulated a 2.5g manoeuvre with a 150% ultimate load, bending the wings at the tips by nearly three metres for three seconds.

US espionage allegations 

According to a report from cybersecurity firm Crowdstrike and a US Justice Department indictment, from 2010 to 2015 the Chinese cyberthreat actor Turbine Panda, linked to the Ministry of State Security’s Jiangsu Bureau, penetrated a number of the C919's foreign components manufacturers including Ametek, Capstone Turbine, GE Aviation, Honeywell, Safran, and others and stole intellectual property and industrial process data with the aim of transitioning component manufacturing to Chinese companies. The report stated that the operations involved both cyber intrusion and theft as well as HUMINT operations, in most cases using a piece of code custom written for this industrial espionage operation.

As of 2019, four people have been arrested in the US as a result of investigations into this economic espionage and theft of trade secrets.

In November 2022, a federal jury in Cincinnati convicted Yanjun Xu, 42, on counts of conspiracy to commit economic espionage, conspiracy to commit trade secret theft, attempted economic espionage and attempted trade secret theft. The US court found that Xu played a key role in a plot to steal trade secrets from western aerospace firms, for the purpose of helping the C919 commercial airliner program. He was sentenced to 20 years in prison.

Flight testing

2017
High-speed taxi tests were completed in April 2017 and the first flight took place on 5 May 2017. At the time, Comac had a planned test programme of 4,200 flight hours and introduction to service in 2020. It was estimated that this could be delayed into 2021.
The European Aviation Safety Agency is intended to validate the Chinese type certificate.
The 4,200 hours of testing planned were higher than the 3,000 hours typically required for the Airbus or Boeing narrowbodies, but lower than the 5,000 hours needed for the ARJ21.

Comac had its second prototype ready on 28 July 2017, aiming to fly it within the year for engine, APU, fuel system and extreme weather tests.
The flight-test plan included six aircraft.
The five-month delay between first and second flights, while the second prototype was being ground-tested, was extraordinary: in 2013 the Airbus A350 flew again after five days and in 2015 the troubled Mitsubishi MRJ flew again after eight days.

On 3 November, it made its third flight in 3h 45min, reaching .

The second prototype made its first flight on 17 December 2017. The flight test program allocated the first three prototypes for aircraft performance and engine and power systems testing, the fourth prototype for avionics and electrical system, and the fifth and sixth prototypes for passenger facilities, including the cabin and information system.

2018
The delay between first and subsequent flights underlined the program immaturity by maiden flight: flying early at low speed and altitude is possible but faster and higher is limited by aeroelastic flutter needing ground vibration testing and aircraft instrumentation which were not ready in May.
Due to flight testing problems, the 2020 introduction previously scheduled was delayed to 2021, for China Eastern Airlines.
In February 2018, the first prototype was flying more than once a week.

In June 2018, Aviation Week reported flight-test aircraft grounding for modifications, extending the schedule by three months but maintaining a 2020 certification target.
The two prototypes needed their flaps and tailplanes modified, due to delamination of the carbon-fiber reinforced plastic elevators.
The third test aircraft was also being modified and maximum-rate pressurization was tested.
As three other planes will be available in 2019, Comac maintains first deliveries for 2021.

Comac denied any grounding and highlighted that modifications were part of the flight test process, stating the two first aircraft were flying stability tests and checking systems.
The first was calibrated and had its counterweight and trailing cone systems modified while the second had its functions and systems checked.
The third was in final assembly with its wing and fuselage joined, cables and systems were being installed for a first flight target by the end of the year.
On 12 July, the second prototype flew from Shanghai-Pudong to Dongying Airport in 1h 46min to allow for various meteorological conditions testing.
In September, Comac expected to conduct 1,500 test flights for over 2,000 flying hours before the first delivery and planned to fly the third prototype before the end of 2018.

In October 2018, the flight-deck design was re-evaluated to comply with US FAR Part 25.1302, not necessary for CAAC but for FAA certification to sell it outside China, a result of inexperience of the aircraft design process. Developing a Chinese engine to replace the CFM Leap-1C would take at least another 15 years.
At that time the two prototypes had flown less than 150 h, averaging less than 5 h per month each.
To achieve certification in December 2020 and first delivery in 2021, the planned 4,200 h of flight tests would need 33 hours a month each if the last four prototypes are evenly spaced before year-end-2019.
Newest airliner designs like the Airbus A350 needed a 2,600 hour test program, and the Mitsubishi MRJ is expected to need 3,000 h.

On October 15, 2018, ten Chinese nationals, including intelligence officials, were indicted by the US for allegedly working with COMAC to allegedly steal the secrets of thirteen foreign aerospace companies working on the C919.

By the end of 2018, the first prototype was to enter flutter flight tests after having completed ground tests.
The third prototype made its maiden flight on 28 December for 1h 38 min.

2019
A fourth prototype conducted its maiden flight on 1 August 2019 from Shanghai Pudong International Airport.
A fifth prototype conducted its first flight on 24 October 2019, also from Shanghai airport; the fifth prototype was expected to test for extreme weather conditions, the environmental control system, drainage systems and electrical supplies.
Comac rescheduled its certification target from 2020 to 2021, with the first delivery the following year.

The sixth and final prototype, intended for the flight certification program, completed its maiden flight on December 27, 2019. Reports at the time indicated that the C919 was expected to commence commercial service with China Eastern Airlines in either 2021 or 2022.

2020

On 27 November 2020, the C919 received its type inspection authorization from the CAAC, meaning that "the aircraft design has been finalised and verified, and that no major changes can be made to its structure." COMAC hoped to proceed with more intensive flight tests to certify airworthiness by 2021 and to commence deliveries.

2021

After completing cold-weather testing in China's Inner Mongolia, the C919 is slated to conduct flight tests in natural icing conditions from London International Airport in Ontario, Canada during March 2021. However, these tests may be delayed depending on the progression of the COVID-19 pandemic.

2022

The C919 completed its first pre-delivery flight test at Shanghai Pudong International Airport. Comac reports that the aircraft (B-001J, MSN107) successfully completed a 3-hour test session on 14 May 2022. The aircraft bearing the livery of China Eastern Airlines, was set to be delivered in 2022. In May 2022, the jet was listed for a price of 653 million yuan (US$ million), almost matching the Airbus A320neo and the Boeing 737 MAX competitors, and twice the US$50 million price initially anticipated.

The airline flew a number of route-proving flights throughout 2022 to reinforce its viability on important segments. Many of the flights were flown between different Chinese cities. Around the same time, the first production aircraft, bound for China Eastern Airlines, started performing flight tests to ensure its preparation for commercial service. COMAC reported after the first flight that all pre-set tasks were accomplished successfully. It is forecasted that one C919 is to be delivered to China Eastern Airlines in 2022, while the remaining four aircraft in the first batch of orders will be delivered in 2023.

The aircraft received its airworthiness certification from the Civil Aviation Administration of China on 29 September 2022 and the first operational airframe intended for commercial service was delivered to launch customer China Eastern Airlines on 9 December 2022 in Shanghai. The aircraft is expected to enter into regular service in spring 2023.

Design

Configuration and performance
This may allow for a common unit load device to be used for both aircraft. It has a  wingspan ( with winglets). The aircraft's intended payload capacity will be 20.4 tonnes. There will be two variants: the standard version with a  range, and a  extended-range version.
The C919 is a conservative design, similar to the 30 years older A320.

Construction
The center wing box, outer wing box, wing panels, flaps, and ailerons are planned to be built in Xi'an, China; the center fuselage sections are planned to be built in Hongdu, China. Aluminium-lithium alloys account for 8.8% of the structure and composite materials for 12%. The air frame will be made largely of aluminium alloy. Aircraft design and assembly is performed in Shanghai.

Wings
The wing is of a supercritical design, increasing aerodynamic efficiency by 20% and reducing drag by 8% compared to a non-supercritical wing. The center wing box was originally intended to use carbon fibre composites. It was changed later to an aluminium design to reduce design complications.

Systems

The engine's nacelle, thrust reverser and exhaust system will be provided by Nexcelle, with such features as an advanced inlet configuration, the extensive use of composites and acoustic treatment and an electrically operated thrust reverser. Michelin will supply Air X radial tyres.
Its integrated modular avionics architecture is based on Ethernet.
The landing gear is made in China by a joint venture of Germany's Liebherr and Avic's Landing Gear Advanced Manufacturing Corp: Liebherr LAMC Aviation.

While the airframe is entirely made by Chinese Avic, some systems are made by joint-ventures with foreign companies located within China: with UTAS for the electric power, fire protection and lighting; with Rockwell Collins for the cabin systems and avionics, with Thales for the IFE, with Honeywell for the flight controls, APU, wheels and brakes; with Moog for the high lift system; with Parker for the hydraulics, actuators and fuel systems, with Liebherr for the landing gear and air management; and the CFM engine and Nexcelle nacelle are entirely foreign.

Engines

Pratt & Whitney and CFM International proposed engines for the aircraft, the PW1000G and LEAP-1C respectively; the LEAP-1C was selected.

AVIC Commercial Aircraft Engine Co was also tasked with developing an indigenous engine for the aircraft. The ACAE CJ-1000A was unveiled at the 2012 Zhuhai Airshow.

Assembly of the first CJ-1000AX engine was completed in 18 months in December 2017. The planned entry to service was 2021.
The engine first ran in May 2018 to 6,600 rpm core speed.

In February 2020, Reuters reported that the US government considered blocking GE from selling the LEAP-1C engine to Comac, citing concerns of reverse engineering, competition for Boeing, and military use of technology. Then-President Donald Trump tweeted opposition, saying that national security should not be grounds for trade restrictions. The US eventually granted GE a license to sell the engines.

Market 

In 2012 the C919 order book stood at 380 units worth US$26 billion, and averaging $ million. FlightGlobal's Ascend market values in 2013 were $49.2 million for the Airbus A320neo, % less than its $100.2 million list price and $51.4 million for the Boeing 737 MAX-8, % less than its $100.5 million list price.

The Chinese airlines that have placed orders for the C919 already have either the Boeing 737 or Airbus A320 in their fleets. In 2013, Chinese state-owned newspaper Global Times complained that an Aviation Week editorial about the bleak prospects for the aircraft "maliciously disparaged the future outlook for the C919".

COMAC aims to take a fifth of the global narrowbody market and a third of the Chinese market by 2035. It expects 2,000 sales in the next 20 years. The Financial Times commented that China considers it as a source of national pride. It also claimed the C919 is outdated by 10–15 years compared to the latest versions of the A320 and Boeing 737, and will probably cost more to operate.
FlightGlobal forecasts 1,209 deliveries: 687 standard and 522 stretched variants, for 85% in China.

Orders
At the November 2010 Zhuhai Airshow, Comac announced orders for 55 C919 aircraft from six airlines, with an additional 45 options. The purchasing airlines or lessors included China Eastern Airlines, Air China, Hainan Airlines, China Southern Airlines, CDB Leasing Company, and GE Capital Aviation Services. On 19 October 2011, Chinese ICBC Leasing ordered 45 C919s and agreed to be the launch customer. On 11 November 2014, Comac announced at the 2014 Zhuhai Airshow that China Merchants Bank's aircraft leasing division made a firm commitment for 30 C919s, and that total orders were now up to 450 aircraft.

At the June 2015 Paris Air Show, Ping An Leasing signed a letter of intent for 50 C919s, becoming one of Comac's largest customers, and Puren Group signed a letter of intent for seven C919s and seven ARJ21s, intended for the start-up Puren Airlines.
In November 2016 COMAC has received an order for 20 C919s including 5 firm from Shanghai Pudong Development Bank Financial Leasing and for 36 C919s from CITIC Group Financial Leasing including 18 firm.
While no down payments were needed before its maiden flight, 500,000 yuan ($76,000) were deposited subsequently for each firm order.
The 5 December 2017 ICBC Leasing order for 55 brought the order book to 785.
In February 2018, its total order book was for 815, before the order for 200 from HNA Group in June 2018, along with 100 ARJ-21s.
By August 2018, FlightGlobal counted 305 orders plus 45 options and 658 letters of intent:  commitments.

The first commercial airframe was delivered to China Eastern Airlines on 9 December 2022.
By January 2023, COMAC reported having received more than 1,200 orders and aimed to expand its annual production capacity to 150 airliners in five years.

Deliveries

The first operational C919 airframe intended for commercial service was delivered to China Eastern Airlines on 9 December 2022.

Cancelled

Specifications (C919ER)

See also

Notes

References

External links

 
 

Comac aircraft
2010s Chinese airliners
Twinjets
Low-wing aircraft
Aircraft first flown in 2017